For the orthopedic surgeon who pioneered the use of internal fixation to treat broken bones, see Maurice Edmond Müller

Maurice Müller (born 12 August 1992) is a German footballer who most recently played for TSV Steinbach Haiger.

References

External links

Maurice Müller at FuPa

1992 births
Living people
German footballers
SV Wacker Burghausen players
FC Schalke 04 II players
SpVgg Neckarelz players
TSV Steinbach Haiger players
Regionalliga players
3. Liga players
Association football midfielders